Ricardo Valiente Román (born 22 August 1968) is a Peruvian athlete. He competed in the men's long jump and the men's triple jump at the 1988 Summer Olympics.

References

External links
 

1968 births
Living people
Athletes (track and field) at the 1987 Pan American Games
Athletes (track and field) at the 1988 Summer Olympics
Peruvian male long jumpers
Peruvian male triple jumpers
Olympic athletes of Peru
Place of birth missing (living people)
South American Games gold medalists for Peru
South American Games silver medalists for Peru
South American Games bronze medalists for Peru
South American Games medalists in athletics
Competitors at the 1986 South American Games
Competitors at the 1990 South American Games
Pan American Games competitors for Peru
20th-century Peruvian people